The 2009–10 Championnat National was the 17th edition of the 3rd division league. Play commenced on 7 August 2009 and ended on 21 May 2010.

Promotion and relegation
Teams relegated from 2008–09 Ligue 2
 18th Place: Amiens
 19th Place: Reims
 20th Place: Troyes

Teams promoted to 2009–10 Ligue 2
 Champions: Istres
 Runners-up: Laval
 3rd Place: Arles

Teams promoted from 2008–09 Championnat de France Amateurs
 Champions, Groupe B: Hyères
 2nd Place, Groupe B: Fréjus
 Champions, Groupe C: Luzenac
 2nd Place, Groupe C: Moulins
 Champions, Groupe D: Rouen
 2nd Place, Groupe D: Plabennec

Teams relegated to Championnat de France Amateurs 2009-10
 17th Place: Niort
 18th Place: Calais
 19th Place: Cherbourg
 20th Place: L'Entente
 DNCG Ruling: Libourne-Saint-Seurin
 DNCG Ruling: Besançon

DNCG Rulings
All clubs that secured Championnat National status for next season were subject to approval by the DNCG before becoming eligible to participate.

Following the DNCG's annual report on clubs, on 25 June, it was announced that six clubs had been relegated from the National to lower divisions. AS Beauvais, SO Cassis Carnoux, CS Louhans-Cuiseaux, and FC Libourne Saint-Seurin were relegated to the Championnat de France Amateurs. Besançon RC, US Luzenac, and FC Rouen, who were all recently promoted, were relegated to Championnat de France Amateurs 2, while FC Sète and Calais RUFC were relegated to the Division d'Honneur. All clubs relegated were allowed to appeal the decision.

Following an appeal from the aforementioned clubs, FC Rouen, AS Beauvais, and US Luzenac had their appeals overturned meaning they will remain in the Championnat National. Some clubs were, however, unsuccessful. FC Sète's appeal was upheld relegating them to the Division d'Honneur. Stade Plabennecois will replace them in the Championnat National. FC Libourne Saint-Seurin, Besançon RC, and Calais RUFC appeals were also rejected by the DNCG, however, all three clubs have decided to take their case to the CNOSF, the National Sporting Committee of France which governs sport in France. Both Calais and Besançon's rulings were determined on 23 July. The CNOSF determined that Besançon should be relegated to the CFA and not CFA 2, while Calais should respect and oblige the DNCG's ruling relegated them to CFA 2.

Libourne's ruling was determined on 27 July, when the CNOSF informed the club that they should honour the DNCG's ruling and suffer relegation to the CFA. Libourne's chairman Bernard Layda responded by announcing the club will file for bankruptcy, restructure the club, and oblige the ruling. Besançon and Libourne were replaced by ES Fréjus and AS Moulins.

Both CS Louhans-Cuiseaux and SO Cassis Carnoux had their appeals heard by the DNCG on 9 July. On 10 July, the DNGC ruled that both Louhans-Cuiseaux and Cassis-Carnoux rulings had been overturned meaning they will play in the Championnat National this season.

League table

Results

Stats

Top goalscorers

Source: FootNational

Stadia

Last updated: 7 April 2010

Managerial changes

During summer break

In season

References

External links
Championnat National Official Site
Championnat National Standings
Championnat National Statistics

2009-10
France
3